Werner Heel (born 23 March 1982) is an Italian former World Cup alpine ski racer.

Born in Meran, Heel grew up in St. Leonhard in Passeier and currently resides in Meran, where he works as a police officer. Heel began skiing at the age of four, and his main disciplines are downhill and super-G. In order to be competitive in super combined he also practices slalom. In 2004 he won the Italian championship in super-G at Caspoggio. His career has been slowed by several injuries.

Heel has been in a relationship with fellow alpine skier Manuela Mölgg since 2009: as of 2018 the couple were engaged.

European Cup
During the 2005 season, Heel achieved his best results in the European Cup with two third places in the downhill races in Roccaraso and Bad Kleinkirchheim and a fourth place in the super-G race in Tarvisio.

World championships
He participated in the 2007 World Championships in Åre without finishing his run in the Super Combined, and placed 27th in the super-G.

World Cup
Heel debuted in the World Cup on 28 December 2001 at the Stelvio downhill in Bormio, finishing 37th. In the 2007 season, he achieved his first top ten finish at the Kvitfjell downhill and finished 12th at Lake Louise.

The 2008 season started very well for Heel, finishing 6th in the Lake Louise downhill. He won his first race on 29 February 2008 in the Kvitfjell downhill. One day later he reconfirmed his potential finishing third in the second Kvitfjell World Cup downhill. He concluded the 2008 season with his best super-G result, a 7th place in Bormio on 13 March 2008. Near his hometown, Heel won the Super-G at Val Gardena on 19 December 2008. On 12 March 2009 he concluded his outstanding 2008/2009 season with a super-G victory in Åre, finishing second in the overall super-G world cup.

Heel races on Atomic skis.

Season standings

Standings through 28 January 2018

Race podiums
 3 wins – (1 DH, 2 SG)
 10 podiums – (5 DH, 5 SG)

World Championship results

Olympic results

References

External links
 
 Italian Winter Sports Federation – (FISI) – alpine skiing – Werner Heel – 
 Atomic Skis – athletes – Werner Heel
 

1982 births
Living people
Sportspeople from Merano
Italian male alpine skiers
Germanophone Italian people
Olympic alpine skiers of Italy
Alpine skiers at the 2010 Winter Olympics
Alpine skiers of Fiamme Gialle
Alpine skiers at the 2014 Winter Olympics